On The Border Mexican Grill & Cantina is a chain of Tex-Mex food casual dining restaurants located in the United States and South Korea.  The chain and brand name is owned by Argonne Capital Group.

History
The first On The Border location opened on October 29, 1982 in Dallas, Texas.  On March 3, 2009, the chain lost its wholly owned subsidiary designation when it was merged into Brinker International as a company brand. In 2010, Brinker International sold On the Border to Golden Gate Capital. OTB Acquisition LLC, an affiliate of Golden Gate Capital, announced that it had completed its acquisition of On The Border Mexican Grill & Cantina from Brinker International, Inc. (NYSE: EAT). On April 24, 2014, the chain was once again sold to another private equity firm by the name of Argonne Capital Group.

Restaurants
The chain operates over 150 restaurants within the United States and thirteen locations (7 stores in Seoul, Bucheon, Goyang, Hanam, Suwon, Daejeon and Busan) in South Korea.

Products
The restaurant is known for its selection of fajitas and wide selection of margaritas. It is also known for "Guacamole Live," the preparation of fresh guacamole tableside.

Criticism
For several consecutive years, Men's Health rated On the Border as one of the unhealthiest chains on its annual "Restaurant Report Card."  In 2010, the magazine named On the Border the worst chain in its Mexican category, noting that an enchilada meal contained over 1,600 calories, and desserts typically contained over 1,000 calories each.

References

Restaurant chains in the United States
Restaurants in Dallas
Mexican restaurants
Companies based in Dallas
Restaurants established in 1982
1982 establishments in Texas
2010 mergers and acquisitions
2014 mergers and acquisitions
Mexican restaurants in the United States